Milad Pakparvar (born 3 October 1994) is an Iranian professional footballer who plays as a winger.

Club career
Khaziravi joined Esteghlal Ahvaz in summer 2015, after graduating from Foolad Academy. He made his professional debut for Esteghlal Ahvaz on August 7, 2015 against Siah Jamegan Khorasan where he used as a substitute for Mobin Mirdoraghi.

Club statistics

Club

Honours
Churchill Brothers
Baji Rout Cup runner-up: 2022

References

External links
 Milad Pakparvar at IranLeague.ir

1994 births
Living people
Iranian footballers
Esteghlal Ahvaz players
Association football midfielders
People from Ahvaz
Sportspeople from Khuzestan province